The Rural Municipality of Terrell No. 101 is a rural municipality (RM) in the Canadian province of Saskatchewan within Census Division No. 3 and  Division No. 2. It is located in the southwest portion of the province.

History 
The RM of Terrell No. 101 incorporated as a rural municipality on January 1, 1913.

Geography 
The Dirt Hills are in the RM.

Communities and localities 
The following unincorporated communities are within the RM.

Organized hamlets
 Bayard

Localities
 Cardross
 Crystal Hill
 Galilee
 Spring Valley

Demographics 

Government 
The RM of Terrell No. 101 is governed by an elected municipal council and an appointed administrator that meets on the second Wednesday of every month. The reeve of the RM is Darrell Howe while its administrator is Kimberly Sippola. The RM's office is located in Spring Valley.

References 

Terrell

Division No. 3, Saskatchewan